Chang Sung Kim is a Korean-Argentine actor. He works in the 2012 telenovela Graduados and has received the Tato Award for his work in Graduados.

Biography
Chang Sung Kim (Korean:김창성) moved from South Korea to Buenos Aires with his family at the age of 7, without knowledge of the Spanish language. He studied karate, and got the Black belt rank. Married to the actress Clarisa Waldman, he gave up his job of weaving at the age of 35, and began an acting career as well, as he saw that she enjoyed doing it. Chang Sung Kim studied in the theater school of Raúl Serrano. He worked in TV series as Hombres de Honor and Los Simuladores, and films as Pompeya, Viudas and Mi primera boda.

He worked in the 2012 telenovela Graduados as Walter Mao, the assistant of the owner of a firm played by Juan Leyrado. This is his first steady job in a television series, as he had only worked as a supporting role so far. He pointed that, unlike his previous plays, his character in Graduados avoids the usual stereotypes of Asian people, such as the perceived lack of language fluency. His character, albeit Asian, includes several Argentine customs; Sung feels Argentine himself, despite lacking citizenship. The writers initially envisioned a character similar to Waylon Smithers from The Simpsons; Sung thought that the idea would not work and provided his own ideas to outline the character. As his character would be a dog in the Chinese astrology, he included traits of a dog in it, such as the loyalty; and although he never worked with Leyrado he admires his work. An episode of the series included a parody of the "Gangnam Style" dance by the South Korean rapper Psy. He received a Tato Bores award for his work in the telenovela, as new actor.

He has signed to work in the 2013 comedy that Underground productions will produce at the end of Graduados.

Works

Television

Films

Awards

References

External links
 
 Cine Nacional.com 

1960 births
Argentine people of Korean descent
Argentine male film actors
Argentine male television actors
Living people
Argentine male karateka
South Korean emigrants to Argentina
Male actors of Korean descent